This is a partial list of Christian film production companies.

List - Top Christian Film Production Companies & Filmmakers:

Affirm Films

Angel Studios

Dallas Jenkins

Erwin Brothers

Kendrick Brothers

Kingdom Story Company

Lightworkers Media

Loaves & Fishes Productions

Pinnacle Peak Pictures

Provident Films

Companies

A 
Advent Film Group
Affirm Films - A label of Sony Pictures Entertainment's Sony Pictures Worldwide Acquisitions
Angel Studios

B 
Believe Pictures
Big Idea Entertainment

C 
Capernaum Studios
ChristianCinema.com
Cloud Ten Pictures
Crystal Creek Media

D 
Dallas Jenkins
*[[dkWard Creative Evangelistic Ministries]]

E 
Elevating Entertainment Motion Pictures
Erwin Brothers
Eternal Pictures
Exploration Films

F 
Faith Films
Five & Two Pictures
Fox Faith -  A former label of 20th Century Fox

G 
Gateway Films/Vision Video
Gener8Xion Entertainment

J 
Jeremiah Films

K 
Kendrick Brothers
Kingdom Story Company

L 
Lightworkers Media - A subsidiary of MGM Holdings (parent of Metro-Goldwyn-Mayer)
Limelight Department
Loaves & Fishes Productions

M 
Mary Esther Ruth, Inc. dba MER Productions

P 
Paula Bryant-Ellis
Paulist Productions
Pinnacle Peak Pictures
PorchLight Entertainment
Protestant Film Commission
Provident Films

R 
 Reverence Gospel Media

S 

 Sherwood Pictures
 Sight & Sound Films

U 
Uplifting Entertainment

V 
VidAngel

See also 
List of Christian films
List of film production companies